Robert "Wingnut" Weaver (born 1965) is an American surfer. He has appeared in several of Bruce Brown's surf films, starring in three of them alongside Pat O'Connell. In 1991, Weaver graduated from University of California, Santa Cruz with a degree in economics and marketing.

Films 
Weaver starred in:
The Endless Summer II (1994)
The Endless Summer Revisited (2000)
Step Into Liquid (2003)
Chasing Dora (2006)
Wingnut's Search For Soul (1997)

References

Further reading
 Robert "Wingnut" Weaver (2009) Wingnut's Complete Surfing, McGraw-Hill Professional.

External links 

1965 births
Living people
American surfers
Newport Harbor High School alumni
University of California, Santa Cruz alumni